Trpčane is a village southeast of Ilirska Bistrica in the Inner Carniola region of Slovenia.

Mass graves
Trpčane is the site of a mass grave and an unmarked grave from the end of the Second World War. They both contain the remains of German soldiers from the 97th Corps that were killed at the beginning of May 1945. It contains the remains of either four or 20 soldiers.

Church
The small church in the settlement is dedicated to Saint Anthony of Padua and belongs to the Parish of Podgraje.

References

External links
Trpčane on Geopedia

Populated places in the Municipality of Ilirska Bistrica